The Alma-Ata Protocols were the founding declarations and principles of the Commonwealth of Independent States (CIS). The leaders of Russia, Ukraine, and Belarus had agreed to the Belovezha Accords on 8 December 1991, declaring the Soviet Union dissolved and forming the CIS.  On 21 December 1991, Armenia, Azerbaijan, Belarus, Kazakhstan, Kyrgyzstan, Moldova, Russia, Tajikistan, Turkmenistan, Ukraine, and Uzbekistan agreed to the Alma-Ata Protocols, formally establishing the CIS.  The latter agreement included the original three Belavezha signatories, as well as eight additional former Soviet republics. Georgia was the only former republic that did not participate while Lithuania, Latvia and Estonia refused to do so as according to their governments, the Baltic states were illegally incorporated into the USSR in 1940.

The protocols consisted of a declaration, three agreements and separate appendices.  In addition, Marshal Yevgeny Shaposhnikov was confirmed as acting Commander-in-Chief of the Armed Forces of the Commonwealth of Independent States. Separate treaty was signed between Belarus, Kazakhstan, Russia, and Ukraine "About mutual measures in regards to nuclear weapons".

The Alma-Ata Protocols removed any doubt that the Soviet Union no longer existed "as a subject of international law and geopolitical reality" (in the words of the Belovezha Accords' preamble), since 11 of the 12 remaining republics had declared that the Soviet Union had dissolved. The signatories preemptively accepted the resignation of Soviet President Mikhail Gorbachev, who told CBS News that he would resign when he saw the CIS was a reality. Gorbachev resigned on 25 December, and the Soviet of the Republics of the Supreme Soviet of the USSR voted the Soviet Union out of existence on 26 December.

Agreement on Councils of Heads of State and Government
A provisional agreement on the membership and conduct of Councils of Heads of State and Government was concluded between the members of the Commonwealth of Independent States on 30 December 1991.

Agreement on strategic forces
Concluded between the 11 members of the Commonwealth of Independent States on 30 December 1991.

Agreement on armed forces and border troops
Concluded between the members of the Commonwealth of Independent States on 30 December 1991.

See also 

 CIS Charter

References

External links
The Alma-Ata Protocols (Russian language). Archive of Egor Gaidar 
The Alma-Ata Protocols (Russian language) 
English translation

Commonwealth of Independent States
Dissolution of the Soviet Union
1991 in the Soviet Union
Treaties of Moldova
Treaties of Azerbaijan
Treaties of Armenia
Treaties of Kazakhstan
Treaties of Kyrgyzstan
Treaties of Tajikistan
Treaties of Turkmenistan
Treaties of Uzbekistan
Treaties concluded in 1991
Treaties establishing intergovernmental organizations
Commonwealth of Independent States law